Mollie Campbell (born 28 February 1995) is a British basketball player for Durham Palatinates and the Great Britain national team.

She won a silver medal at the 2018 Commonwealth Games and represented Great Britain at the FIBA Women's EuroBasket 2019.

References

External links

1995 births
Living people
British expatriate basketball people in the United States
British women's basketball players
English women's basketball players
Forwards (basketball)
Leicester Riders players
Sportspeople from Rochdale
University of Arkansas at Pine Bluff alumni
Alumni of Durham University
Basketball players at the 2018 Commonwealth Games
Commonwealth Games silver medallists for England
Commonwealth Games medallists in basketball
Medallists at the 2018 Commonwealth Games